Chesworth may refer to:

People
 David Chesworth (born 1958), artist and composer. 
 Frank Chesworth (1873–1907), English footballer
 George Chesworth (1930–2017), Royal Air Force officer.
 Kara Chesworth (born 1972) English racing cyclist.

Other
 Chesworth House, former Tudor manor house.